The following lists events that happened during 1829 in Australia.

Incumbents
Monarch – George IV

Governors
Governors of the Australian colonies:
 Governor of New South Wales – Ralph Darling
 Lieutenant-Governor of Van Diemen's Land – Colonel George Arthur
 Lieutenant-Governor of the Swan River Colony – Captain James Stirling.

Events
14 May – Aboriginal mission on Bruny Island opened by George Augustus Robinson.
8 June – Captain James Stirling founds the Swan River Colony in Western Australia, landing at Garden Island.
18 June – Official proclamation of the Swan River Colony.

Births

 11 June – Sir Edward Braddon, 18th Premier of Tasmania (born in the United Kingdom) (d. 1904)

References

 
Australia
Years of the 19th century in Australia